New Poets of England and America was a poetry anthology edited by Donald Hall, Robert Pack and Louis Simpson, and published in 1957 by Meridian Books. In the post-war story about relations between American and British poetry, it represents the moment of closest rapprochement, actual or intended. The Introduction by Robert Frost is oblique on the topic. The inclusion of a number of British Movement poets, as well as others, implies some kind of search for matching figures amongst the Americans. Poets had to be under forty years old to be included.

Poets in New Poets of England and America
Kingsley Amis - William Bell - Robert Bly - Philip Booth - Edgar Bowers - Charles Causley - Henri Coulette - Donald Davie - Catherine Davis - Keith Douglas - Donald Finkel - W. S. Graham - Charles Gullans - Thom Gunn - Donald Hall - Michael Hamburger - Elizabeth R. Harrod - John Heath-Stubbs - Anthony Hecht - Geoffrey Hill - John Hollander - John Holloway - Elizabeth Jennings - Donald Justice - Ellen de Young Kay - Melvin Walker La Follette - Joseph Langland - Philip Larkin - Robert Layzer - Robert Lowell - William Matchett - Thomas McGrath - William Meredith - James Merrill - W. S. Merwin - Robert Mezey - Vassar Miller - Howard Moss - Howard Nemerov - Robert Pack - Alastair Reid - Adrienne Cecile Rich - Jon Silkin - Louis Simpson - William Jay Smith - W. D. Snodgrass - May Swenson - Wesley Trimpi - Jon Manchip White - Reed Whittemore - Richard Wilbur - James Wright

See also
 1957 in poetry
 1957 in literature
 20th century in literature
 20th century in poetry
 American literature
 English literature
 List of poetry anthologies

Poetry anthologies